Dove Creek may refer to:

Dove Creek, Colorado, a town
Dove Creek (Colorado), a stream in Colorado
Dove Creek (Missouri), a stream in Missouri